Ralph Andrew Knibbs is an English former rugby union player who played for Bristol.

Rugby career
He made his debut as a seventeen-year-old against Pontypridd RFC in 1982, scoring with his first touch of the ball. Knibbs had a repertoire of running angles and scored many individual tries in his Bristol career which lasted until 1996. He played in the 1983 cup final as an eighteen-year-old, and represented Gloucestershire in all their games in the 1982/83 championship-winning campaign. He was also an accomplished basketball player, athlete and American football player before his rugby career. He played for the South West Division, England under-23s, and the England Sevens.

He turned down the chance to go on the 1984 England rugby union tour of South Africa, because of his opposition to apartheid. He also declared himself unavailable for 1988 England rugby union tour of Australia and Fiji, due to work commitments, making him one of the only players ever to turn down England national rugby union team twice. Despite this, Knibbs made 436 appearances for Bristol, scoring 123 tries, and was vice-captain during the centenary season. He later captained Clifton Rugby Football Club where he ended his career.

On 18 February 2007 Knibbs was also named in The Sunday Times top 10 centres of time along with names such as Brian O'Driscoll and Simon Halliday by Bath rival Jeremy Guscott who described Knibbs as being "silky and absolutely superb" and whom admitted it was a "crying shame he never won an England cap".

2016 attempted murder
On 22 March 2016 Knibbs was a victim of attempted murder by transgender fell runner Lauren Jeska. Knibbs was stabbed several times in the head and neck by Jeska in a "premeditated and savage attack" at Alexander Stadium, in Birmingham. This resulted in life threatening injuries and Knibbs suffering a stroke. The attack occurred in the context of a planned review of Jeska's status as a female athlete because of the fact she had been born a man. Jeska admitted attempted murder and was jailed for 18 years.

Knibbs suffered long-term nerve damage from the attack and the life-saving surgery he underwent afterwards. The stroke he suffered caused sight loss in both eyes and temporarily blinded him in one eye. He also has limited movement and difficulty eating owing to the severed nerves and is disabled.

References

1964 births
Living people
Bristol Bears players
English people with disabilities
English rugby union players
English victims of crime
Gloucestershire County RFU players
Rugby union players from Bristol
Rugby union centres